Luke Delaney (born 1979) is a retired major in the United States Marine Corps and NASA astronaut candidate. Delaney is from DeBary, Florida.

Early life and education
He graduated from Deltona High School in Deltona, Florida. He holds a degree in mechanical engineering from the University of North Florida and a master’s degree in aerospace engineering from the Naval Postgraduate School.

Career
Began his military enlisting in the United States Marine Corps in 1998. He is a distinguished naval aviator who participated in exercises throughout the Asia-Pacific region and conducted combat missions in support of Operation Enduring Freedom. Completed the Naval Aircrew Candidate School at Naval Air Station Pensacola where he was selected to be a KC-130 Navigator. Graduated from the Marine Corps Expeditionary Warfare School in Quantico, Virginia. He attended Marine Aerial Navigator School at Randolph Air Force Base in Texas.  As a test pilot, he executed numerous flights evaluating weapon systems integration, and he served as a test pilot instructor. Delaney retired from the Marine Corps in 2020 and transitioned as a research pilot at NASA’s Langley Research Center, in Hampton, Virginia, where he supported airborne science missions. Including his NASA career, Delaney logged more than 3,700 flight hours on 48 models of jet, propeller, and rotary wing aircraft.

Astronaut candidacy
On December 6, 2021, he was revealed to be one of the 10 candidates selected in the 2021 NASA Astronaut Group 23, to report for duty in January 2022.

References

Astronaut candidates
United States Marine Corps personnel of the War in Afghanistan (2001–2021)
Naval Postgraduate School alumni
Military personnel from Florida
United States Marine Corps officers
University of North Florida alumni
Living people
1979 births